Gary Adams may refer to:
 Gary Adams (baseball) (born 1939), American college baseball coach
 Gary Adams (golf) (1943–2000), salesman and founder of TaylorMade Golf
 Gary K. Adams, president and CEO of CMAI